Eirini, also known as Irini on signage, is a station on Line 1 of the Athens Metro. It is adjacent to the Athens Olympic Sports Complex in Marousi, a northern suburb of Athens, Greece,  from the starting point of the line at Piraeus. It opened on 3 September 1982 and was renovated in 2004.

Station layout

References

External links 
 Information from Athens Metro

Athens Metro stations
Railway stations opened in 1982
1982 establishments in Greece